E. O. "Doc" Hayes (1906 – February 26, 1973) was an American  basketball coach.  He served as head basketball coach at Southern Methodist University (SMU) from 1947 to 1967, during which time, his teams won eight Southwest Conference (SWC) titles and reached six NCAA Tournaments. In 1956, Hayes' Mustangs, led by Jim Krebs, made the only Final Four appearance in program history.

Eighteen of Hayes' players earned a total of thirty All-SWC honors, and two players earned All-America honors. Hayes is a member of The Texas Sports Hall of Fame, and will be inducted into SMU's Athletics Hall of Fame on May 18, 2012. He died in 1973.

Regarding the rule that coaches must remain seated during a game, Hayes was quoted as saying: "If you've got 10,000 people seated in an arena and everybody's standing up and hollering and you expect the coaches and players to be quiet and relaxed, you're going to have to give them a sedative. Then the coach probably will be fired at the end of the season and the players cut off their scholarships."

Hayes and his wife, Kathleen, were killed in a one-car accident near Terrell, Texas on February 26, 1973.

Head coaching record

College

See also
 List of NCAA Division I Men's Final Four appearances by coach

References

1906 births
1973 deaths
American men's basketball coaches
American men's basketball players
Basketball coaches from Texas
Basketball players from Texas
College men's basketball head coaches in the United States
High school basketball coaches in Texas
North Texas Mean Green men's basketball players
People from Denton County, Texas
Road incident deaths in Texas
SMU Mustangs men's basketball coaches